Drunken Monkey is a 2003 Hong Kong martial arts film directed by and starring Lau Kar-leung. It was the first kung fu film released by the Shaw Brothers Studio in two decades.  This was the final film Kar-leung directed before dying on June 25, 2013.

Cast 
 Lau Kar-leung as Master Man Bill
 Wu Jing as Great Uncle Tak
 Lau Wing-kin as Chan Kai-yip
 Shannon Yao as Siu-Ma
 Chi Kuan-chun as Yui Hoi-Yeung
 Gordon Liu as Detective Hung Yat Fu
 Lau Kar-wing as Fighter in the beginning
 Li Hai-tao

Release 
Drunken Monkey was released in Hong Kong on 5 May 2003. It grossed a total of HK$153,560.

Reception 
Ken Eisner of Variety wrote that the film's fight choreography overcomes its cheesiness and derivative story.  David Cornelius of DVD Talk rated it 3/5 stars and wrote, "When the action's on, 'Drunken Monkey' is a total blast. When the action's off, 'Drunken Monkey' is a total snooze."

References

External links 
 

2003 films
2003 martial arts films
Hong Kong action comedy films
Hong Kong martial arts films
2000s Cantonese-language films
Kung fu films
Films directed by Lau Kar-leung
2000s Hong Kong films